Rameez Junaid and David Pel were the defending champions, but only Junaid chose to defend his title, partnering Jozef Kovalík. Junaid lost in the quarterfinals to Andre Begemann and Fabrice Martin.

Kevin Krawietz and Andreas Mies won the title after defeating Begemann and Martin 6–2, 6–4 in the final.

Just three weeks later, Krawietz and Mies would defeat Martin and Jérémy Chardy in the final of the French Open to win their first Grand Slam title.

Seeds

Draw

References

External links
 Main draw

Heilbronner Neckarcup - Doubles
2019 Doubles